The 2000 Troy State Trojans football team represented Troy State University—now known as Troy University—as a member of the Southland Football League during the 2000 NCAA Division I-AA football season. Led by tenth-year head coach Larry Blakeney, the Trojans finished the season with an overall record of 9–3 and a mark of 6–1 in conference play, winning the Southland title. For the third consecutive season and the seventh time in eight years, Troy State advanced to the NCAA Division I-AA Football Championship playoffs, losing to Appalachian State in the first round. The Trojans finished the season ranked No. 9 in the Sports Network poll. The team played home games at Veterans Memorial Stadium in Troy, Alabama.

In the spring of 2001,  forfeited two wins from the 2000 season, over Troy State and Nicholls State, because an ineligible player had participated for the Demons in those games. With the forfeit, the Trojans' record improved to 10–2 overall and 7–0 in conference play.

Schedule

References

Troy State
Troy Trojans football seasons
Troy State Trojans football